Markus Amm (born 1969, Stuttgart, West Germany) is an artist based in London.

He has shown work internationally in exhibitions including Finding Neverland at Patricia Low Contemporary in Gstaad, Alles in einer Nacht at Tanya Bonakdar in New York City, The Addiction at Gagosian Gallery in Berlin and New Party at The Breeder Projects in Athens.

References

An article about Markus Amm by Oliver Koerner von Gustorf

German artists
Living people
Amm Markus
Date of birth missing (living people)